In mathematics, a bump function (also called a test function) is a function  on a Euclidean space  which is both smooth (in the sense of having continuous derivatives of all orders) and compactly supported.  The set of all bump functions with domain  forms a vector space, denoted  or   The dual space of this space endowed with a suitable topology is the space of distributions.

Examples

The function  given by

is an example of a bump function in one dimension. It is clear from the construction that this function has compact support, since a function of the real line has compact support if and only if it has bounded closed support. The proof of smoothness follows along the same lines as for the related function discussed in the Non-analytic smooth function article. This function can be interpreted as the Gaussian function  scaled to fit into the unit disc: the substitution  corresponds to sending  to 

A simple example of a (square) bump function in  variables is obtained by taking the product of  copies of the above bump function in one variable, so

Existence of bump functions

It is possible to construct bump functions "to specifications".

The construction proceeds as follows. The latter is just a bump function with a very small support and whose integral is  Such a mollifier can be obtained, for example, by taking the bump function  from the previous section and performing appropriate scalings.

An alternative construction that does not involve convolution is now detailed. 

If  then let  while if  then let ; so assume  is neither of these.
For every  let

The series 

Moreover, for any non-negative integers 

Properties and uses

While bump functions are smooth, they cannot be analytic unless they vanish identically . This is a simple consequence of the identity theorem. Bump functions are often used as mollifiers, as smooth cutoff functions, and to form smooth partitions of unity.  They are the most common class of test functions used in analysis. The space of bump functions is closed under many operations.  For instance, the sum, product, or convolution of two bump functions is again a bump function, and any differential operator with smooth coefficients, when applied to a bump function, will produce another bump function.

The Fourier transform of a bump function is a (real) analytic function, and it can be extended to the whole complex plane: hence it cannot be compactly supported unless it is zero, since the only entire analytic bump function is the zero function (see Paley–Wiener theorem and Liouville's theorem). The Fourier transform of the particular bump function

from above can be analyzed by a saddle-point method, and decays asymptotically as

for large .

See also

Citations

References

  

Smooth functions
Schwartz distributions